Donaldo Açka (born 17 September 1997) is a Greek-Albanian professional footballer who plays as a defensive midfielder. In his career, Açka also played for clubs such as Luftëtari or Politehnica Iași, among others.

References

External links
 Profile FSHF.org
 

1997 births
People from Preveza (regional unit)
Living people
Greek people of Albanian descent
Albanians in Greece
Greek expatriates in Albania
Greek expatriate footballers
Association football defenders
Association football midfielders
Albanian men's footballers
Luftëtari Gjirokastër players
Kategoria Superiore players
A.E. Karaiskakis F.C. players
Liga I players
FC Politehnica Iași (2010) players
Liga II players
FC Universitatea Cluj players
FC Haka players
Veikkausliiga players
Albanian expatriate footballers
Expatriate footballers in Romania
Albanian expatriate sportspeople in Romania
Expatriate footballers in Finland
Albanian expatriate sportspeople in Finland
Greek expatriate sportspeople in Romania
Greek expatriate sportspeople in Finland
Footballers from Epirus (region)